Gritti is an Italian surname. Notable people with the surname include:

Aloisio Gritti (died 1534), Venetian noble
Andrea Gritti (1455–1538), Doge of Venice
Carillo Gritti (1942–2016), Brazilian Roman Catholic bishop
Cornelia Barbaro Gritti (1719–1808), Venetian poet and salon-holder
Lodovico Gritti (1480–1534), Venetian politician
Matteo Gritti (born 1980), Italian footballer
Triadan Gritti, 15th-century Venetian nobleman, diplomat and military officer

Italian-language surnames